Lindsey Port is a Minnesota politician and a member of the Minnesota Senate. A member of the Minnesota Democratic Farmer-Labor Party, she represents Senate District 56, which includes parts of Burnsville, Savage, and Lakeville in Dakota and Scott counties in the southern Twin Cities metropolitan area.

Early life, education 
Port grew up in Sioux Falls, South Dakota, with her parents and sister. She moved to Minnesota in 2001 to attend the University of Minnesota – Twin Cities.

Minnesota Senate
Port was elected to the Minnesota Senate in 2020 with 53% of the vote, defeating Republican incumbent Dan Hall. In 2016 she ran for the Minnesota House of Representatives in District 56B and lost to Republican incumbent Roz Peterson.

Port serves on the following committees:
Commerce and Consumer Protection Finance and Policy Committee
Housing Finance and Policy Committee
Technology and Reform Policy Committee

Personal life 
Port lives in Burnsville with her husband and two kids and serves as the Executive Director of a professional development nonprofit group.

References 

Democratic Party Minnesota state senators
21st-century American politicians
21st-century American women politicians
Women state legislators in Minnesota
People from Burnsville, Minnesota
Year of birth missing (living people)
Living people